Josephine Ruth Bartley is a New Zealand politician who is an Auckland Councillor.

Political career

Bartley was elected to the Maungakiekie-Tamaki Local Board in the 2010 local elections and re-elected in 2013 and 2016. Bartley was the chair of the board from 2016-2018.

In February 2018 she was elected as councillor representing the Maungakiekie-Tāmaki ward on the Auckland Council in a by-election following the resignation of councillor Denise Lee. Bartley is the first Pacific woman to be elected to Auckland Council.

In the 2019 local body elections, Bartley was re-elected, growing her majority from 7225 to 8358. 

In November 2021, Bartley received a substantial number of threats of violence because of her involvement in the COVID-19 vaccine rollout.

Personal life 
Bartley is Samoan, her father's village is Tapatapao and her mother's is Singamoga.

References

Living people
New Zealand people of Samoan descent
21st-century New Zealand women politicians
Auckland Councillors
New Zealand Labour Party politicians
Unsuccessful candidates in the 2008 New Zealand general election
Year of birth missing (living people)
People educated at McAuley High School